Chrysitrix is a group of plants in the Cyperaceae described as a genus by Linnaeus in 1771.

It is native  to Cape Province in South Africa and also the State of Western Australia.

Species

Chrysitrix capensis - Cape Province
Chrysitrix distigmatosa - Western Australia
Chrysitrix dodii - Cape Province
Chrysitrix junciformis - Cape Province

References

Cyperaceae
Poales genera